Armando Efren Begines Avalos (born 26 March 1983 in Guadalajara, Jalisco) is a Mexican professional footballer who currently plays for Laredo Heat in the USL Premier Development League.

Begines played for C.D. Chivas USA in Major League Soccer in 2005.  Begines came to Chivas USA from parent club Chivas de Guadalajara, and also played for their other farm club, La Piedad. He has been a part of the Chivas system since 1999.  Begines was released by Chivas USA in November 2005.

References

1983 births
Living people
Footballers from Guadalajara, Jalisco
Association football defenders
Mexican footballers
Chivas USA players
Querétaro F.C. footballers
Club Celaya footballers
La Piedad footballers
Laredo Heat players
Expatriate soccer players in the United States
Mexican expatriates in the United States
Major League Soccer players
USL League Two players